Emilio José Viqueira Moure (born 20 September 1974) is a Spanish former professional footballer who played as a central midfielder.

His early career was connected with Deportivo – albeit mostly with its B team – and he also represented three other clubs in his country in a 15-year senior career, mainly Recreativo.

Over six seasons, Viqueira amassed La Liga totals of 108 games and five goals. He added 186 matches and 13 goals in the Segunda División.

Club career
A skilled playmaker, Viqueira was born in Santiago de Compostela, Galicia, and he made his professional debut with local Deportivo de La Coruña, appearing in 26 matches through two seasons (19 in 1995–96, as they finished ninth). After an abroad stint with lowly Portuguese Primeira Liga side S.C. Campomaiorense he returned to A Coruña, playing another year with the reserves.

After two seasons with Xerez CD, winning promotion to the Segunda División in 2001, Viqueira switched to neighbours Recreativo de Huelva, where he would experience his most steady and fruitful period. After 32 La Liga games in the 2002–03 campaign, with relegation, he added a further 40 three years later – with three goals – as his team returned to the top division.

Viqueira joined Levante UD in July 2007 but, as many other players, would leave the club in the following January transfer window due to the Valencians' severe financial crisis, joining old acquaintance Xerez on loan until the rest of the second-tier season. The move was made permanent subsequently.

Viqueira was greatly hampered by injuries in 2009–10, Xerez's first ever campaign in the top flight, appearing in only 17 matches and completing just two. After the Andalusians were immediately relegated the player, aged almost 36, decided to retire, being appointed his last club's director of football shortly after; in June 2012, he stepped down from his post.

In May 2013, Viqueira became sporting director at Gimnàstic de Tarragona. He left the position five years later and, subsequently, worked in the same capacity with CD Lugo.

References

External links

1974 births
Living people
Spanish footballers
Footballers from Santiago de Compostela
Association football midfielders
La Liga players
Segunda División players
Segunda División B players
Deportivo Fabril players
Deportivo de La Coruña players
Xerez CD footballers
Recreativo de Huelva players
Levante UD footballers
Primeira Liga players
S.C. Campomaiorense players
Spain youth international footballers
Spanish expatriate footballers
Expatriate footballers in Portugal
Spanish expatriate sportspeople in Portugal